Patsy McLarnon is an Irish former Gaelic footballer who played in the 1958 All-Ireland Final.

References

Derry inter-county Gaelic footballers
Year of birth missing
Place of birth missing
Possibly living people